The Gondrand massacre was a 1936 Ethiopian attack on Italian workers of the Gondrand company. It was publicized by Fascist Italy in an attempt to justify its ongoing conquest of Ethiopia.

History

The Gondrand massacre occurred on February 13, 1936, near the northern Ethiopian town of Mai Lahlà, the current Rama. A camp of civilian workers for the logistics company Gondrand, engaged at the time in road construction, was attacked at dawn by Ethiopian soldiers under the orders of Ras Imru. The construction yard was equipped with about 15 muskets, and the workers also used their work tools as defense weapons, but they were overwhelmed by the surprise attack of the Ethiopians.

Casualties

Of the 130 workers present, 68 Italians were killed, and the bodies of 17 of them were castrated in contravention of Ethiopian Emperor Haile Selassie's explicit order not to mutilate enemy corpses, while 27 others were wounded and four went missing. Of these, two were later confirmed to have been taken prisoner.

About 40 Ethiopian soldiers also died in the attack, mostly because a store of gelignite exploded. Retaliatory massacres were carried out by Italian soldiers against Ethiopian civilians in the aftermath of the attack, resulting in untold deaths.

Publicity 
Italian authorities generally instructed journalists to avoid describing Italian losses during the war, but in this case the story was deliberately promoted for its propaganda value in depicting Ethiopians as barbaric.

The killing of Italian pilot Tito Minniti and his copilot happened some weeks before and together with this massacre was the reason given by the Italians for the use of gas against the Ethiopians, a claim supported by historians like Tripoli and Pedriali. However, as professor of Italian studies David Forgacs argues, while "the Italians sought to give maximum publicity to the massacre of Italian civilians by Ethiopians at the Gondrand camp they were equally strenuous in their efforts to prevent records or reports of their own massacres of civilians".

In response to photographic evidence that some Ethiopian troops had ignored the order against mutilating corpses, Ethiopia's Foreign Minister was forced to admit that it had happened, but argued that it should be seen as an act of protest against Italian atrocities.

See also

 Second Italo-Ethiopian War
 Italian Ethiopia

Notes

1936 in Ethiopia
Mass murder in 1936
February 1936 events
Massacres in 1936
Second Italo-Ethiopian War
History of Ethiopia
Italian East Africa
Massacres in Ethiopia
1936 murders in Ethiopia
Anti-Italian sentiment